Young-Ja Cho (born 1951 Busan, South Korea) is a South Korean sculptor.

Life
Young-Ja Cho was born in Bussan, South Korea, but currently lives in Molicciara, Italy. She is inspired by Buddhism and Greek mythology; concepts from her native country and her country of residence. Her bronze sculptures usually feature fragments of the human figure, combined with plants and animals. The fragmented forms suggest an ongoing narrative of agrarian allure and oneness with nature. A graduate of Hongik University, she has shown her bronze works extensively in Seoul, including a group show in 1989 entitled 'Women Artists in the 1980s', held at the Kumho Gallery.

Her work is in the National Museum of Women in the Arts.

References

South Korean artists
South Korean sculptors
South Korean expatriates in Italy
South Korean women artists
Living people
1951 births